Birgitta Ingvaldsdotter (1468 – after 1527) was a Swedish merchant. She belongs to the earliest businesswomen in Sweden about whom there is any significant amount of documentation.

She was the daughter and heiress of the rich Stockholm merchant Ingvald Torstensson (d. 1505) and Anna Jakobsdotter (d. 1491). She married in 1490 to merchant Anders Svensson Hellsing (d. 1503), to merchant in Stockholm Gert Brüning (d. 1518) in 1504, and to merchant Hans Nagel in 1522.

Birgitta Ingvaldsdotter managed the business of her husband's in her own name as a widow in 1503–1504 and 1518–1522, as well as during the illness of her first spouse in 1502–1503. But she was evidently active as the business partner of her husbands also during their lifetime. It is explicitly stated that it was she personally who handled the important business transactions with the iron and copper producers in Bergslagen, whose products belonged to the most valuable things exported from Sweden to Lübeck by the family trading house.  She belonged to the Swedish merchant elite of her time: in 1518–1522, she was one of the biggest taxpayers in Sweden.

In 1527, she requested to make use of the new law introduced during the Swedish Reformation which allowed her to retract some houses donated by her family to the Catholic church. This is the last time she is documented.

References

Further reading 
 

1468 births
16th-century Swedish businesspeople
16th-century businesswomen
16th-century Swedish women
Year of death unknown
15th-century businesspeople
15th-century Swedish people
15th-century merchants
15th-century Swedish women
Medieval businesswomen